Caroline Brunet (born March 20, 1969 in Quebec City, Quebec) is a Canadian sprint kayaker who competed from the late 1980s to 2004. Competing in five Summer Olympics, she won three medals in the K-1 500 m event with two silvers (1996, 2000) and one bronze (2004).

Brunet also has won 21 medals at the ICF Canoe Sprint World Championships with ten golds (K-1 200 m: 1997, 1998, 1999, 2003; K-1 500 m: 1997, 1998, 1999; K-1 1000 m: 1997, 1999; K-4 200 m: 1995), seven silvers (K-1 200 m: 1995, 2002; K-1 500 m: 1995, 2002, 2003; K-1 1000 m: 1998, K-2 500 m: 1999), and four bronzes (K-1 200 m: 1994, K-1 500 m: 1993, K-2 1000 m: 2003, K-4 200 m: 1994).

References

External links
 
 

1969 births
Canadian female canoeists
Canoeists at the 1988 Summer Olympics
Canoeists at the 1992 Summer Olympics
Canoeists at the 1996 Summer Olympics
Canoeists at the 2000 Summer Olympics
Canoeists at the 2004 Summer Olympics
French Quebecers
Living people
Lou Marsh Trophy winners
Olympic canoeists of Canada
Olympic silver medalists for Canada
Olympic bronze medalists for Canada
Sportspeople from Quebec City
Olympic medalists in canoeing
ICF Canoe Sprint World Championships medalists in kayak
Medalists at the 2004 Summer Olympics
Medalists at the 2000 Summer Olympics
Medalists at the 1996 Summer Olympics